Ergavia is a genus of moths in the family Geometridae. The genus was erected by Francis Walker in 1866.

Species
Ergavia benesignata (Dognin, 1906)
Ergavia borrowsi Prout, 1917
Ergavia brunnea (Schaus, 1901)
Ergavia carinenta (Cramer, 1777)
Ergavia costimaculata Prout, 1913
Ergavia divecta (Warren, 1908)
Ergavia drucei Schaus, 1901
Ergavia endoeasta Prout, 1917
Ergavia eris Prout, 1916
Ergavia exstantilinea Prout, 1932
Ergavia illineata (Warren, 1908)
Ergavia leopoldina Prout, 1932
Ergavia liraria (Guenee, 1858)
Ergavia merops (Cramer, 1775)
Ergavia obliterata Schaus, 1901
Ergavia oenobapta Prout, 1934
Ergavia piercei Prout, 1917
Ergavia roseivena Prout, 1910
Ergavia stigmaria (Walker, 1860)
Ergavia subrufa (Warren, 1897)
Ergavia venturii Prout, 1917

References

Oenochrominae